The 1996–97 Cypriot Fourth Division was the 12th season of the Cypriot fourth-level football league. Adonis won their 1st title.

Format
Fourteen teams participated in the 1996–97 Cypriot Fourth Division. All teams played against each other twice, once at their home and once away. The team with the most points at the end of the season crowned champions. The first three teams were promoted to the 1997–98 Cypriot Third Division and the last three teams were relegated to regional leagues.

Point system
Teams received three points for a win, one point for a draw and zero points for a loss.

Changes from previous season
Teams promoted to 1996–97 Cypriot Third Division
 Iraklis Gerolakkou
 ASIL Lysi
 Kinyras Empas

Teams relegated from 1995–96 Cypriot Third Division
 Digenis Oroklinis
 Digenis Akritas Ypsona
 Fotiakos Frenarou

Teams promoted from regional leagues
 Enosis Kokkinotrimithia
 SEK Agiou Athanasiou

Teams relegated to regional leagues
 Ethnikos Defteras
 Livadiakos Livadion
 APEY Ypsona

League standings

Results

See also
 Cypriot Fourth Division
 1996–97 Cypriot First Division
 1996–97 Cypriot Cup

Sources

Cypriot Fourth Division seasons
Cyprus
1996–97 in Cypriot football